Zbigniew Komorowski is a Polish former competitive figure skater. He is the 1994 Polish national senior champion, having won the junior title in the 1991–92 season. He placed 14th at the 1992 World Junior Championships and 18th at the 1994 European Championships. His club was Unia Oświęcim.

Competitive highlights

References 

Polish male single skaters
Living people
People from Oświęcim
Year of birth missing (living people)